The Honeysuckle Bower  is a self-portrait of the Flemish Baroque painter Peter Paul Rubens and his first wife Isabella Brant, executed c. 1609. They wed on 3 October 1609, in St. Michael's Abbey, Antwerp, shortly after he had returned to the city after eight years in Italy.

The painting is a full-length double portrait of the couple seated in a bower (wikt) of honeysuckle. They are surrounded by love and marriage symbolism: the honeysuckle and garden are both traditional symbols of love, and the holding of right hands (junctio dextrarum) represents union through marriage. Additionally, Rubens depicts himself as an aristocratic gentleman with his left hand on the hilt of his sword.

Details

Notes

External links

 Web Gallery of Art

Portraits by Peter Paul Rubens
Collection of the Alte Pinakothek
1600s paintings
Self-portraits
17th-century portraits